Lem Winchester (March 19, 1928 – January 13, 1961) was an American jazz vibraphone player.

Early life
Lemuel Winchester was born in Wilmington, Delaware. His parents were politician William J. Winchester and Alverta Winchester.

Career
Formerly a police officer, Winchester pursued music as a hobby in Wilmington, Delaware. He turned to music full-time after an appearance at the 1958 Newport Jazz Festival. He was soon working with some of the top names in jazz, making his debut recording with pianist Ramsey Lewis.

Winchester recorded a handful of albums as a leader, and made sideman appearances with the likes of saxophonist Oliver Nelson, and organists Jack McDuff and Shirley Scott. Most of his recordings were with Prestige Records. Critic Scott Yanow has suggested that while Winchester's playing was strongly influenced by Milt Jackson, but he "did not stick around long enough to carve out his own original voice" on the vibraphone.

Death

Winchester died at the age of 32 as a result of a handgun accident in Indianapolis, Indiana.

Discography

As leader
 1958: New Faces at Newport (Metrojazz) split album with Randy Weston
 1958: Lem Winchester and the Ramsey Lewis Trio (Argo) with Ramsey Lewis
 1959: Winchester Special (New Jazz) with Benny Golson
 1960: Lem's Beat (New Jazz)
 1960: Another Opus (New Jazz)
 1960: Lem Winchester with Feeling (Moodsville)

As sideman
 1960: Jack McDuff, Tough 'Duff (Prestige)
 1960: Oliver Nelson, Taking Care of Business (New Jazz)
 1960: Oliver Nelson, Nocturne (Moodsville)
 1960: Shirley Scott, Soul Sister (Prestige)
 1960: Etta Jones, Something Nice (2 cuts only) (Prestige)
 1961: Johnny "Hammond" Smith, Gettin' the Message (Prestige)
 1963: Etta Jones, Hollar! (4 cuts) (Prestige)

References

1928 births
1961 deaths
American jazz vibraphonists
Prestige Records artists
Firearm accident victims in the United States
20th-century American musicians
Musicians from Wilmington, Delaware
Accidental deaths in Indiana
Deaths by firearm in Indiana